Dugald "Doug" McGregor (1890-1948) was a pioneering rugby league footballer who played in the 1900s and 1910s from Queensland. An Australia national representative , he also played for both the Queensland and New South Wales teams.

Playing career
McGregor played in Brisbane for the Fortitude Valley club.
During the 1909 New Zealand rugby league tour of Australia, when the Kiwis traveled to Brisbane for a Test match against Australia, McGregor was selected to play at fullback, becoming Kanagroo No. 46. In doing so he also set the record for the youngest player for Australia at 19 years and 5 days.

When the New Zealand Māori rugby league team toured that year, McGregor played at fullback against them for Queensland as well as Australia.

The following year, during the 1910 Great Britain Lions tour of Australia and New Zealand, when they travelled to Brisbane for a Test match against Australia, McGregor, who was playing for Bundaberg, was selected to represent his country.

McGregor later moved south, joining Sydney club, Glebe for the 1912 NSWRFL season. That year he was selected to play for New South Wales at fullback against Queensland, kicking three goals.

References

1890 births
1948 deaths
Australian rugby league players
Australia national rugby league team players
Fortitude Valley Diehards players
Glebe rugby league players
New South Wales rugby league team players
Queensland rugby league team players
Rugby league fullbacks
Rugby league players from Brisbane